Jawahar Navodaya Vidyalaya, Megdong, popularly known as JNV Megdong is a part of Jawahar Navodaya Vidyalaya institutions in India. It is located in Megdong village in Upper Subansiri district in the Indian state of Arunachal Pradesh.

Geographic location 
JNV Megdong is located in a rural area on right bank of Subansiri River in Megdong village. It located at a distance of about 10 km from city center of Daporijo, administrative headquarter of Upper Subansiri district.

Admissions 
Admission to JNV Megdong is based on an annual merit test, called the Jawahar Navodaya Vidyalaya Selection Test (JNVST). The test in Upper Subansiri district is designed, developed and conducted by the CBSE, for class VI and for lateral admissions in the class IX and XI subject to available seats if any. The merit test is held as per policy of Navodya Vidyalaya Samiti.

Affiliations 
JNV Megdong is a Central Board of Secondary Education affiliated school and follows the syllabus prescribed by CBSE.

See also 
 Jawahar Navodaya Vidyalaya
http://www.jnvmegdong.in/

References

External links 
 Navodaya Vidyalaya Samiti Official Website
 NVS Regional office, Shillong region

Schools in Arunachal Pradesh
Jawahar Navodaya Vidyalayas in Arunachal Pradesh
Educational institutions established in 1987
1987 establishments in Arunachal Pradesh